The Irish League in season 1916–17 was suspended due to the First World War. A Belfast & District League was played instead by 6 teams, and Glentoran won the championship.

League standings

Results

References
Northern Ireland - List of final tables (RSSSF)

1916-17
1916–17 in European association football leagues
Irish